One Sports is a Philippine Free-to-air television network owned by Nation Broadcasting Corporation (NBC) and jointly operated by TV5 Network, Inc. and Cignal TV, Inc., a wholly-owned subsidiary of MediaQuest Holdings, Inc. media arm of PLDT Beneficial Trust Fund. One Sports is currently carried through analog via DWNB UHF TV Channel 41 in Metro Manila and other relay and affiliate stations nationwide, and as a digital television subchannel in select areas of the country. It operates Monday to Saturday from 8:00 AM to 12:00 MN and Sunday from 6:00 AM to 12:00 MN.

One Sports is the second MediaQuest channel launched under the One branding (presently known as the One Network Media Group), along with the English-language news channel One News, Filipino-language news/talk channel One PH, lifestyle portal One Life, and now-defunct premium entertainment channel One Screen.

History
Prior to the launch, it was then known as 5 Plus, a dedicated sports channel launched on January 13, 2019 replacing AksyonTV.

On March 8, 2020, One Sports was launched as a free-to-air television channel by Cignal TV (which owns the said brand on its own cable channel) and TV5, with TV5 Network's sports division adopted the same branding coinciding with the start of the 2020 PBA season.

From March 30 to June 14, 2020, the terrestrial network temporarily suspended its broadcast due to the COVID-19 pandemic and the enforcement of the enhanced community quarantine in Luzon.

Following the closure of ABS-CBN Sports after 70 congressmen denied ABS-CBN Corporation's new franchise, One Sports replaced certain programming such as the NFL, the NCAA (US) and Philippine Super Liga with some sports whose rights were previously held by ABS-CBN Sports, such as the NBA, ONE Championship, UAAP and Premier Volleyball League.

Programming

One Sports programming includes extreme sports, collegiate sports, e-sports, sports entertainment, and other sports-related content. The network may take on the responsibility of airing sports programs produced by One Sports division in the event that TV5 is unable to carry them due to breaking news or any special programming. A selection of One Sports sports coverage will be made available online through their official website and various social media platforms.

One Sports+

One Sports+ is a Philippine pay TV channel owned by Cignal TV. It is the cable/satellite counterpart of the main One Sports channel. Unlike its terrestrial network counterpart, the channel broadcasts sports-related programs and live sporting events 24 hours a day, all year round.

The original One Sports channel was launched on January 9, 2019 on satellite provider Cignal, replacing Hyper. On March 8, 2020, following the launch of the One Sports brand on free-to-air television (replacing 5 Plus), the original One Sports channel on Cignal has been rebranded as One Sports+, making them as the fourth One-branded channel.

One Sports+ current programming
 Copa Paulino Alcantara
 Premier Volleyball League
 Maharlika Pilipinas Basketball League
 Billie Jean King Cup
 WWE SmackDown
 WWE Bottom Line
 Spikers' Turf
 PGA Tour
 Showtime Championship Boxing
 Golden Boy Boxing
 Glory Kickboxing
 Cage Warriors
 LPGA
 2019 William Jones Cup
 The Game

Previous programming
 Philippine Super Liga

See also
TV5
One PH
92.3 Radyo5 True FM
One Sports (sports division)
PBA Rush
Kapamilya Channel
Heart of Asia Channel
Pinoy Hits
5 Plus (defunct channel)
AKTV (defunct channel)
Hyper (defunct channel)
Nation Broadcasting Corporation
List of analog television stations in the Philippines
Media of the Philippines

Notes

References

 
TV5 Network channels
Television channels and stations established in 2019
Television networks in the Philippines
Sports television networks in the Philippines
Filipino-language television stations
English-language television stations in the Philippines
Cignal TV